The 1976 World Series of Poker (WSOP) was a series of poker tournaments held in May 1976 at Binion's Horseshoe.

Preliminary events

Main Event

There were 22 entrants to the main event. Each paid $10K to enter the winner-take-all tournament. The 1976 Championship was the first WSOP Main Event to award the winner a gold bracelet along with the cash prize.

Final table

Notes 

World Series of Poker
World Series of Poker